Malo Konare is a village located in Pazardzhik Municipality, Pazardzhik Province, of southern Bulgaria.   it has 3,856 inhabitants.

It is located at altitude of 209 metres above the sea level,  to the east of Pazardzhik in a fertile plain. Agriculture is the main occupation for the population. The main products are cereals, rice, vegetables (tomatoes, peppers, watermelons, potatoes, cabbages, beans), orchards, grapes. Livestock breeding is also well-developed, including mainly cattle, pigs, poultry. The village has a kindergarten, school, chitalishte and library with more than 14,000 books.
There is a church "Sv. Atanasii" built in 1802.

References 

Villages in Pazardzhik Province